The Men's 1500 metres event was held on 4 February 2011. 12 athletes participated.

Schedule
All times are Almaty Time (UTC+06:00)

Records

Results

References

Men 1500